Davoud Fanaei (born January 19, 1975, in Tehran) is a retired Iranian football goalkeeper who played most of his career for Persepolis and represented for Iran national football team.

Club career 
He started his career in Persepolis under management of Ali Parvin and was substitute of Ahmadreza Abedzadeh, but slowly made himself a starter later.

Club career statistics

International career 
His last cap was a friendly against Palestine on 4 April 2002.

Honours

Persepolis
Iranian Football League (3): 1998–99, 1999–2000, 2001–02
Hazfi Cup (1): 1998–99

References

External links

Profile at teammelli.com

Iranian footballers
Association football goalkeepers
bahman players
Persepolis F.C. players
Steel Azin F.C. players
Iran international footballers
2000 AFC Asian Cup players
1975 births
Living people
Association football goalkeeping coaches